Amy Kim may refer to:

 Amy Jo Kim, American writer
 Kim Hyun-jung (singer), Korean pop singer